Thomas Cook (fl. 1417–1442) of Exeter, Devon, was an English politician.

Family
He was the son of the MP, John Cook.

Career
He was a Member (MP) of the Parliament of England for Exeter in 
1417, 1435, 1437, 1439 and 1442.

References

Year of birth missing
Year of death missing
English MPs 1417
Members of the Parliament of England (pre-1707) for Exeter
English MPs 1435
English MPs 1437
English MPs 1439
English MPs 1442